Discosauriscus was a small seymouriamorph which lived in what is now Central and Western Europe in the Early Permian Period. Its best fossils have been found in the Broumov and Bačov Formations of Boskovice Furrow, in the Czech Republic.

Classification

Discosauriscus belongs  to the order Seymouriamorpha, and is the type genus of the family Discosauriscidae. Currently recognised are two valid species - Discosauriscus austriacus and Discosauriscus pulcherrimus. Letoverpeton is a junior synonym of Discosauriscus.

Characteristics
Discosauriscids were long thought to be known from larval or neotenic forms, and three ontogenetic stages had been distinguished. However, more recent studies concluded that some subadult, probably terrestrial specimens were known, so the case for neoteny in this taxon is not as well-supported as once thought. Discosauriscus had wide jaws with sharp teeth, short limbs and relatively long tail. The phalangeal formula was 2-3-4-5-3 for both hind- and forelimbs. The body was covered with rounded scales with concentric rings, and a well-preserved lateral-line system has been described.

Discosauriscus may have had electroreceptive organs.

References  

Seymouriamorphs
Basal tetrapods of Europe
Cisuralian tetrapods of Europe
Fossils of the Czech Republic
Fossil taxa described in 1933